The State Correctional Institution – Phoenix is a state prison in Skippack Township, Montgomery County, Pennsylvania, with a Collegeville postal address, in the Philadelphia metropolitan area. Operated by Pennsylvania Department of Corrections, it was named after the phoenix bird.

Built for $400 million, making it the state prison built for the highest cost in Pennsylvania history, it has a capacity of 3,830 prisoners, and as of September 2018, its full time workforce numbered 1,200. Heery International designed the facility. It replaced SCI Graterford. Most prisoners are male, located in the East and West sub units, while it has a re-entry unit for female prisoners with a capacity of 192. 

The female unit is not in the main prison perimeter. SCI Phoenix houses some men who are sentenced to death under Pennsylvania law. The department of PA Corrections anticipated that most of the prisoners would be from the area of Philadelphia, and currently SCI Phoenix is the state prison closest to Philadelphia.

History

The first bidding for construction of this prison occurred in the decade of the 2000s. The prison, originally to open in November 2014, opened late since Walsh Heery Joint Venture, the construction company, and Hill International, a Philadelphia company representing the State of Pennsylvania, had a dispute over whether the prison was ready to open. , the prison's final cost was still not finalized.

On June 1, 2018, its dedication ceremony was held, and the prison began operations on July 9, 2018. The state began moving Graterford prisoners there on July 11, 2018, and Graterford ended operations on July 15. Graterford's employees now were employees of Phoenix. Some inmates disliked the move as they feared they would be sharing cells with other inmates, while at Graterford they had single cells.

The population of Graterford was to reduce to 2,588 inmates by June 2018, so that the transfer of inmates to Phoenix would not involve as many people, and Phoenix eventually opened, with 2,633 prisoners. Initially, prisoners with life sentences who had single cells at Graterford would continue to have single cells at Phoenix.

Composition
Phoenix has 3,422 beds.

It has inmates convicted of capital murder, many from the Philadelphia area and most of whom were sentenced to life imprisonment but with some under death sentences, housed in a dedicated section of the prison, called the "Capital Unit." That section is larger than the previous capital case section that was in Graterford. 

The PADOC stated that the prison hoped to move inmates with death sentences from SCI Greene, where most death row and capital murder inmates in Pennsylvania reside, to SCI Phoenix so that the prison system can more easily transport them to court proceedings.

Notable inmates
 George Banks, convicted spree killer. Originally sentenced to death, sentence commuted to life in prison on May 12, 2010 after he was declared incompetent to be executed. 
 Cool C, rapper and murderer. Sentenced to death.
 Bill Cosby, actor, comedian, and formerly convicted sex offender who was released on June 30, 2021 after his conviction was vacated by the Pennsylvania Supreme Court.
 Eric Frein, ambushed 2 Pennsylvania State Police, murdering Corporal Bryon K. Dickson Jr., in September 2014. Sentenced to death.
 Melvin Knight, one of the murderers of Jennifer Daugherty. Sentenced to death.
 Joshua Komisarjevsky, one of two men who committed the infamous Cheshire, Connecticut, home invasion murders. Connecticut inmate incarcerated in Pennsylvania, originally sentenced to death commuted to life in prison after the death penalty was declared unconstitutional by the Connecticut Supreme Court. Currently incarcerated in SCI Mahanoy.
 Joseph Ligon, America's oldest and longest-serving juvenile lifer. Originally sentenced to life in prison without parole, released on February 11, 2021, after the United States Supreme Court declared life sentences without parole for juveniles unconstitutional.
Harvey Miguel Robinson, serial killer. Sentenced to death.
 Ricky Smyres, one of the murderers of Jennifer Daugherty. Sentenced to death.
 Ronald Taylor, spree killer who perpetrated the 2000 Wilkinsburg shooting. Sentenced to death.

References

External links
 State Correctional Institution – Phoenix - Pennsylvania Department of Corrections
 SCI Phoenix - Heery International
 "Tour Pennsylvania's newest prison: SCI Phoenix." - Pennlive at YouTube

2018 establishments in Pennsylvania
Buildings and structures in Montgomery County, Pennsylvania
Capital punishment in Pennsylvania
State prisons in Pennsylvania